Stars Go Racing was a six-part reality programme which aired in the summer of 2011 on RTÉ One. Six Irish personalities were shown the business of horse training from six established Irish trainers and then competed against each other at race meetings in Ireland. The final of the competition took place at Leopardstown. The first episode aired on 20 July 2011.
The competition was won by presenter Ella McSweeney.

Competitors

References

2011 Irish television series debuts
Irish reality television series
RTÉ original programming
2011 Irish television series endings